Fernando Smith (born August 2, 1971) is a former American football defensive end who played in the National Football League. He is from Flint, MI and graduated from Flint Northwestern High School and then Jackson State University in 1994.

He was drafted in the second round of the 1994 NFL Draft with the 55th overall pick by the Minnesota Vikings
He played 4 seasons for the Minnesota Vikings, and then one season each for the Jacksonville Jaguars, Baltimore Ravens, St. Louis Rams before retiring in 2001.

External links 
1994 Draft.
Player statistics - Fernando Smith

1971 births
Living people
American football defensive ends
Baltimore Ravens players
Jacksonville Jaguars players
Jackson State Tigers football players
Minnesota Vikings players
Players of American football from Flint, Michigan
St. Louis Rams players